September 12 is a 2010 German-Turkish documentary film, written, produced and directed by Özlem Sulak, which documents the accounts of survivors of the 1980 Turkish coup d'état. The film was selected for the 16th Festival on Wheels and the 63rd Locarno International Film Festival, where it premiered.

Release

Festival screenings 
 63rd Locarno International Film Festival (September 9–19, 2010)
 16th Festival on Wheels (December 9–19, 2010)

See also
 2010 in film
 Turkish films of 2010

References

External links
 

2010 films
German documentary films
2010s Turkish-language films
2010 documentary films
Turkish documentary films
Documentary films about historical events
1980 in Turkey
2010s German films